Carry On the Grudge is the third album by English indie rock singer-songwriter Jamie T, released on 29 September 2014 through Virgin Records and Epitaph Records. The first single from the album, "Don't You Find", was released on 21 July 2014, followed by "Zombie" on 12 August.

The album was Jamie T's first release in over 5 years, Jamie's comeback being described by the NME as the greatest music moment of 2014. The album received commercial success, most noticeably, the track 'Zombie' of the album winning the 2014 NME Awards for best track and best video.

Critical reception

Carry On the Grudge holds a score of 81 out of 100 on the review aggregate site Metacritic, indicating "universal acclaim".

Track listing

Charts

Sales and certifications

References

2014 albums
Jamie T albums
Virgin Records albums
Avex Group albums